The Flamengo Basketball team is a professional Brazilian basketball team based in Rio de Janeiro. It is a part of the Clube de Regatas do Flamengo multi-sports club family. The club's full name is Basquetebol do Clube de Regatas do Flamengo. The club's commonly used short names are C.R.F. Basquete, C.R. Flamengo Basquete, Flamengo Basquete, and FlaBasquete.

Flamengo is one of the most traditional and successful basketball teams in Brazil, having won the top-tier level Brazilian National League title eight times, once during the Brazilian Basketball Championship era, and seven times during the NBB era (the current Brazilian League format). The team also won the South American second-tier level FIBA South American League (LSB) in 2009 (I), the Americas top-tier level FIBA Americas League in 2014 and Basketball Champions League Americas in 2021, and the FIBA Intercontinental Cup twice in 2014 and 2022.

Brazil's senior national team's all time legend, Oscar Schmidt, played with Flamengo between 1999 and 2003, and is one of the most important players in the club's history.

History
The red and black basketball team won its first championship in club history in 1919, while playing in the championship of the city of Rio de Janeiro. The club also won the Rio de Janeiro State Championship in 1932. When the Rio de Janeiro State Championship was again won in 1933, the team was still undefeated. In 1934 and 1935 they won the Rio de Janeiro State Championship title again.

Flamengo Basketball rivalries

Arenas

Hélio Maurício Gym (Gavea)
Hélio Maurício Gym nowadays is used only by the Flamengo Youth Basketball Team, but for a long time the gym received also the professional team matches, including matches of the National League

The gym is quite small, with a seating capacity of 800 people for basketball games. Due to the small capacity, traditionally the professional team used the Maracanãzinho, HSBC Arena, and Carioca Arena 1 when a bigger attendance is expected. The gym is part of the Gávea complex, that includes other two gyms, several tennis court, swimming pools, restaurants, bars, and the Gavea Stadium. Flamengo Basketball professional team later played their home matches at HSBC Arena.

Maracanãzinho 

Ginásio do Maracanãzinho, sometimes called just Maracanãzinho, is a modern indoor arena that is located in Maracanã neighborhood, Rio de Janeiro, Brazil. Its formal name, Ginásio Gilberto Cardoso, honors a former Clube de Regatas do Flamengo president. The capacity of the arena is 11,800 for basketball games. It was opened in 1954. Located near the Maracanã Stadium, Maracanãzinho means Little Maracanã.

For the 2007 Pan American Games, the gym was remodeled, with new central air conditioning, an added four-sided scoreboard, a new sound system, a dome which allows natural lighting during the day, new comfortable seating, and adaptions to all international requirements. As a result, the Maracanãzinho became a venue for the volleyball competitions of the 2007 Pan American Games, and many other international competitions. After the renovations, the capacity of the arena was reduced from  approximately 13,000 to 11,800 spectators for futsal. The arena became more comfortable for spectators, as the field of vision was increased for better viewing of the arena floor.

HSBC Arena

HSBC Arena indoor multi-purpose arena located in the neighborhood of Barra da Tijuca in Rio de Janeiro, Brazil. The arena was completed in 2007, and has a seating capacity of 15,430 people for basketball games. It hosted the basketball and gymnastics events at the 2007 Pan American Games. In December 2007, the arena started being operated by GL Events, who also operates the nearby Riocentro Convention Center and the Riocentro Sports Complex, and started hosting music concerts from a various hand of artists.

Starting 29 March 2008, the arena started to be called HSBC Arena, as part of a naming rights agreement with the bank.

The arena also started to receive Flamengo Basketball team in 2009, for the playoff's games of NBB League, and is the home of the team to the 09–10 season

Ginásio Álvaro Vieira Lima

Flamengo has also used the Ginásio Álvaro Vieira Lima as a home arena. It has a seating capacity of 3,000 people for basketball games. The arena has been often used as the home arena of Flamengo, of the Novo Basquete Brasil (NBB), during the regular season and early playoff rounds.

The arena is often referred to as the Ginásio do Tijuca Tênis Clube, in reference to the neighborhood that it's located in, and to its owner, Tijuca Tênis Clube of the top-tier level Brazilian NBB league.

Carioca Arena 1

Flamengo has also used the Carioca Arena 1 as its home venue. It was constructed for the 2016 Summer Olympics. The arena originally had a seating capacity of 16,000 for the 2016 Olympics, but it was reduced to 6,000 after the Olympics.

Construction on the arena began in July 2013. The arena covers 38 thousand square meters. The arena's capacity for the 2016 Summer Olympics was 16,000 spectators. However, it was lowered to 6,000 after the Olympics. The facade has a height of 33 meters, and its shape is inspired by the mountainous landscape of the city. The track was built with two types of wood, one for a different track and to the surrounding area, as well as a system for absorbing blows of the sport. The arena has 282 rooms, 49 bathrooms, eight dressing rooms and six lifts.

The estimated cost for the planned complex of three arenas (Carioca 1, Carioca 2 and Carioca 3), the IBC, MPC, a hotel, and the structure of the Olympic Park was 1.678 billion Brazilian reais, including part of the public initiative and private money. This was handled between the Prefecture of Rio de Janeiro and the private sector.

The work was completed in January 2016. As a part of the arena's opening events, there was the Basketball Tournament International Women Aquece River, held from 15 to 17, January 2016, and the International Championship of Wheelchair Rugby Rio Aquece, held from 29 to 31 January 2016.

Players

Current roster

Depth chart

Season by season

1Qualified but could not compete due to the suspension of the Brazilian Basketball Confederation by FIBA.

Matches against NBA teams
See also List of games played between NBA and international teams

* First Brazilian team to play against an NBA team on North American soil.
** First Brazilian team to play against an NBA team on Brazilian soil.

Honors and titles

Worldwide
 FIBA Intercontinental Cup
 Champions (2): 2014, 2022
 Runners-up (1): 2019

Latin America
 FIBA Americas League / Champions League
 Champions (2): 2014, 2020–21 (record)
 Runners-up (1): 2020

Continental
 South American Championship of Champions Clubs
 Champions (1): 1953

 FIBA South American League (LSB)
 Champions (1): 2009 (I)
 Runners-up (2): 2008, 2010

National
 Brazilian Championship (NBB)
 Champions (7): 2009, 2012–13, 2013–14, 2014–15, 2015–16, 2018–19, 2020–21 (record)
 Runners-up (1): 2009–10 
 Brazilian Championship (CBB)
 Champions (1):  2008
 Runners-up (4): 1977, 1985, 2000, 2004
 Super 8 Cup
Champions (2):  2018, 2020–21  (record)
Runners-up (1):  2019–20

Regional
 Rio de Janeiro State Championship 
Champions (46): 1932–1935, 1948, 1949, 1951–1960, 1962, 1964, 1975, 1977, 1982, 1984–1986, 1990, 1994–1996, 1998, 1999, 2002, 2005–2016, 2018–2022 (record)
 Runners-up (12): 1950, 1963, 1976, 1981, 1983, 1987, 1988, 1989, 1991, 1997, 2001, 2003

 Rio de Janeiro City Championship
 Champions (2): 1919, 1932

 Rio-São Paulo Championship 
 Champions (1): 1920

Retired numbers

Notable players

 Brazil:
 Affonso Évora
 Alfredo da Motta
 Algodão
 Carioquinha
 Fernando Brobró
 Hélio "Godinho"
 Marcelo Vido
 Marquinhos Leite
 Mário Hermes
 Maury de Souza
 Milton Setrini
 Paulinho Villas-Boas
 Ricardo Guimarães
 Sérgio Macarrão
 Waldir Boccardo

 Brazil (cont.):
 Nilo Guimarães (1984–1985)
 Olívia (1995–1998, 2000–2004, 2005–2007)
 Pipoka (1998–2001)
 Ratto (1998–2001)
 Oscar Schmidt (1999–2003)
 Josuel dos Santos (1999–2005)
 Carlos Olivinha (2003–2009, 2012–)
 Duda Machado (2004, 2007–2013)
 Marcelinho Machado (2007–2018)
 Rafael "Bábby" Araújo (2009, 2010–2011)
 Gegê Chaia (2010–2011, 2012–2016)
 Caio Torres (2011–2013)
 Leandrinho Barbosa (2011)
 Marquinhos Vieira (2012–2021)
 Vítor Benite (2012–2015)
 Cristiano Felício (2013–2015)
 J.P. Batista (2015–2018, 2021–2022)
 Rafael Luz (2015–2016)
 Rafael Mineiro (2015–2017, 2018–)
 Ricardo Fischer (2016–2017)
 Anderson Varejão (2018–2019)
 Rafael Hettsheimeir (2020–2021)
 Yago dos Santos (2020–2022)
 Vítor Faverani (2021–)

 Argentina:
 Federico Kammerichs (2011–2012)
 Nicolás Laprovíttola (2013–2015)
 Walter Herrmann (2014–2015)
 Franco Balbi (2018–2022)
 Luciano González (2020–2021)
 José Vildoza (2022–)
 Martín Cuello (2022–)
 Penka Aguirre (2022–)
 Bahamas:
 David Nesbitt (2018–2019)
 Dominican Republic:
 Ronald Ramón (2016–2018)
 Mexico:
  Luke Martínez (2020–2022)

 United States:
 Marc Brown (1997–1998, 2003–2004)
 David Jackson (2011–2012)
 Jerome Meyinsse (2013–2016)
 M. J. Rhett (2017–2018)
 Brandon Robinson (2021–2022)
  Dar Tucker (2021–2022)
 Venezuela:
 David Cubillán (2017–2018)

Franchise accomplishments and awards

Franchise leaders

Head coaches

 Togo Renan Soares "Kanela"
 Miguel Ângelo da Luz
 Zé Boquinha
 Paulo Sampaio "Chupeta" (2008–2011)
 Gonzalo García (2011–2012)
 José Alves Neto (2012–2018)
 Gustavo de Conti (2018–)

NBB head coaches

Flamengo Women's Basketball

Honors and titles

Continental
 Tournament Chiclayo 
 Champions (1): 1966

 Tournament Lima 
 Champions (1): 1966

 Trophy Valladolid 
 Champions (1): 2001

National
 Piracicaba International Star Tournament
 Champions (2): 1967, 1968

Regional
 State Championship 
 Champions (3): 1954, 1964, 1965

 FBERJ Cup 
 Winners (1): 1997

 Eugenie Borer Cup
 Winners (1): 1997

References

External links
Official club website 
Flamengo Team Profile at Novo Basquete Brasil 
Flamengo Team Profile at Latinbasket.com 

 
B
1919 establishments in Brazil
Basketball teams established in 1919
Sports teams in Rio de Janeiro (city)
Novo Basquete Brasil